Saradzhev is Russian masculine surname, a derivative of the Armenian surname Saradzhian; its feminine counterpart is Saradzheva. The surname may refer to
Konstantin Saradzhev (born Saradzhian; 1877–1954), Armenian conductor and violinist
Konstantin Konstantinovich Saradzhev (1900–1942), Russian composer and musical theorist, son of Konstantin Saradzhev

Russian-language surnames